Naresh Mehta (15 February 1922 - 22 November 2000) was a Hindi writer.  There are over 50 published works in his name, ranging from poetry to plays.  He received several literary awards, most notably the Sahitya Akademi Award in Hindi in 1988 for his poetry collection Aranya  and the Jnanpith Award in 1992.

Among the numerous schools of poetry which sprang up in the 1950s was Nakenwad, a school deriving its nomenclature from the first letters of the names of its three pioneers - Nalin Vilochan Sharma, Kesari Kumar, and Naresh Mehta.

References

External links
 Naresh Mehta at Kavita Kosh
पुस्तक परिचय  (hindu)

Hindi-language poets
Recipients of the Jnanpith Award
2000 deaths
Hindi-language writers
Recipients of the Sahitya Akademi Award in Hindi
1922 births